Pterolocera insignis is a moth of the family Anthelidae. It was described by Gottlieb August Wilhelm Herrich-Schäffer in 1856. It is found in Australia.

References

Moths described in 1856
Anthelidae